Triple Crossing in Richmond, Virginia is one of two places in North America where three Class I railroads cross at different levels at the same spot, the other being Santa Fe Junction in Kansas City. 

At the lowest (ground) level, the original Richmond and York River Railroad was extended after the American Civil War to connect with the Richmond and Danville Railroad, later part of the Southern Railway System, currently part of Norfolk Southern. The line runs east to West Point, Virginia.

The middle level was the main line of the Seaboard Air Line Railroad, now part of CSX Transportation known as the "S" line, just south of Main Street Station. It is planned to become part of the Southeast High Speed Rail Corridor.

At the top level is the Peninsula Subdivision Trestle, a  viaduct parallel to the north bank of the James River built by the Chesapeake and Ohio Railway in 1901 to link the former Richmond and Allegheny Railroad with C&O's Peninsula Subdivision to Newport News and export coal piers.

The viaduct, now owned by CSX Transportation, provided an alternate path to the notoriously unstable Church Hill Tunnel which buried a work train with fatalities on October 2, 1925. A locomotive and ten flat cars remain entombed with at least one rail worker, killing several others whose bodies were eventually recovered.

The triple crossing has been a Richmond attraction for railfans for over 100 years, although the number of photographic angles decreased in the 1990s due to a new flood wall.

See also
List of bridges documented by the Historic American Engineering Record in Virginia

References

External links

Bridges in Richmond, Virginia
Historic American Engineering Record in Virginia
Railroad bridges in Virginia
Trestle bridges in the United States
Metal bridges in the United States